Earthworm is the twenty-second album by the Finnish experimental rock band Circle.

The album has vocals and guitar from Bruce Duff of the band Jesters of Destiny. Circle's relationship with Duff began when Jussi Lehtisalo re-released the Jesters' album Fun at the Funeral on his Ektro Records label. Two tracks from Earthworm (the title track and "Connection") were re-issued twice, firstly on a 7" single included in the 2008 vinyl edition of Circle's album Tulikoira, and on the band's full-length album collaboration with Duff from 2008, Hollywood.

Track listing
 Earthworm (5:12)
 Connection (3:43)
 Taking It Back (5:37)
 Coda (5:39)

Personnel
Bruce Duff
Janne Westerlund
Jussi Lehtisalo
Tomi Leppänen
Mika Rättö

References

External links
Album discography at www.circlefinland.com

Circle (band) albums
2006 albums